Carlos Holguín Sardi (born 16 December 1940) was the 64th and 54th Governor of Valle del Cauca. A Conservative party politician, he served as the 3rd Minister of the Interior and Justice of Colombia from 2006 to 2008, and as the 20th Minister of Communications of Colombia from 1973 to 1974.

When he was just 25, he was elected to the Chamber of Representatives of Colombia for Valle del Cauca and served from 1966 to 1970. He was elected again to Congress in 1982 as Senator of Colombia and served from 1982 to 1990, and again from 1998 to 2006.

References
Presidencia de Colombia - Carlos Holguin Sardi

1940 births
Living people
People from Cali
Carlos
Pontifical Xavierian University alumni
20th-century Colombian lawyers
Colombian Conservative Party politicians
Members of the Chamber of Representatives of Colombia
Members of the Senate of Colombia
Presidents of the Senate of Colombia
Ministers of Communications of Colombia
Mayors of places in Colombia
Governors of Valle del Cauca Department